Jonathan Conneely, Coach JC (born July 22, 1980) is an American Entrepreneur, Coach, Author and Motivational Speaker. Conneely is the founder of Bootcamp Tulsa, Dynamic Sports Development and nonprofit organization Fit First Responders.

Education

Conneely received a Bachelor of Science degree from Oral Roberts University, is a certified Strength and Conditioning Coach from the CSCC, an Olympic Weightlifting Coach from USA Weightlifting, and a certified Life Strategies Coach from the Spencer Institute. He received a practical ministries degree from Victory Bible School in Tulsa.

Career

Conneely started his career as the youngest Director of Strength and Conditioning coach in the nation at the Division 1 level at Oral Roberts University in 1999.

Conneely founded Bootcamp Tulsa, Tulsa's first outdoor fitness program for women in 2008, Dynamic Sports Development, Tulsa's training facility for athletes in 2009, and nonprofit Fit First Responders foundation empowering police officers, firefighters, EMSA medics, and National Guard members to win in their fitness, nutrition, and in life in 2015. Conneely created the Secret to Weight Loss Success for Christians, an 8-week life transformation program created for Christians and church small groups worldwide.

Conneely is an author of the books The Secret to Real Weight Loss Success, The Secret to Real Success: How to Have Anything You Want in Business and in Life in 27 Days, The Secret to Weight Loss Success for Christians, and The Secret to Real Athlete Success.

Conneely opened for Donald Trump as his "Hype Man" in Arkansas for his 2016 campaign speaking to over 12,000 people, and is the speaker of choice for corporations and churches across the country including Victory Christian Center speaking to over 14,000 members.

Coach JC has private labelled his own line of dietary supplements and whey protein.

Awards and recognition
 2009 Tulsey Award in Young Entrepreneur of the Year category for Boot-camp Tulsa.
 Tulsa 40 class of 2014 by Tulsa World
 Citizens Appreciation Award from the Tulsa Police Department, a citizen appreciation award from EMSA, and Recognition from the Tulsa Fire Department.
 2015 Beacon Award for Nonprofits Serving Nonprofits from The Journal Record for his foundation, Fit First Responders.

References

External links
 Five Questions with Jonathan Conneely: Entrepreneur helps people with life, fitness (Tulsa World)
 Taft Price and Coach JC talk Fit First Responders in Tulsa (Yahoo! News)

American exercise and fitness writers
American motivational speakers
21st-century American businesspeople
1980 births
Living people